Jacqueline is a seafood restaurant serving Pacific Northwest cuisine in Portland, Oregon. The restaurant was established in 2016 and has an aquatic theme.

Description 
Eater Portland has described Jacqueline as a "seasonal, vegetable and seafood-focused restaurant". Located in southeast Portland's Hosford-Abernety neighborhood, the restaurant has an aquatic theme and its name alludes to the film The Life Aquatic with Steve Zissou. The interior features a painting of actor Bill Murray. Jacqueline's menu includes Pacific Northwest cuisine, including scallops and pork belly with citrus coconut curry, Dungeness crab and Calabrian chilies over saffron hollandaise toast, and oysters for happy hour.

History 

Chef owners Derek Hanson and Brandi Lansill opened the restaurant with co-owner Brian Dufour on August 24, 2016, in a space which previously housed St. Jack and the French restaurant Renard. Jacqueline began serving brunch in 2017. Lansil was no longer a co-owner, as of 2018.

During the COVID-19 pandemic, the restaurant's take-out menu included tacos, seafood buns, and ceviche. Jacqueline was "reborn" as Fair Weather in early 2021. The daytime cafe operation ended in December 2021. According to Thom Hilton of Eater Portland, Fair Weather's "seasonal doughnuts and colorfully-garnished coffee cocktails made it a social media sensation".

Reception 
In 2017, Jacqueline was nominated for Restaurant of the Year by Eater Portland. Nick Woo included the restaurant in the website's 2019 list of "14 Delightful Spots to Eat and Drink on SE Clinton". Nathan Williams included Jacqueline in Eater Portland's 2022 overview of "Where to Crack Open a Dungeness Crab in Portland". He said Jacqueline "is one of the city's finest spots for seasonal seafood, and its Dungeness crab toast is easily one of its menu's biggest stars".

See also 
 List of Pacific Northwest restaurants
 List of seafood restaurants

References

External links

 
 

2016 establishments in Oregon
Hosford-Abernethy, Portland, Oregon
Pacific Northwest restaurants in Oregon
Restaurants established in 2016
Seafood restaurants in Portland, Oregon